Interventricular foramen may refer to:

 Interventricular foramen (embryology)
 Interventricular foramina (neuroanatomy)